The Falschauer is a river in South Tyrol, Italy. It flows into the Adige near Lana.

References 
Civic Network of South Tyrol 

Rivers of Italy
Rivers of South Tyrol